The Bourbonette Oaks Stakes is an American Thoroughbred horse race held annually at Turfway Park at Florence, Kentucky.  Open to three-year-old fillies, the event is contested on dirt over a distance of one mile (8 furlongs). The race is a Grade III event with a purse of $150,000 and has been a prep race to the Triple Tiara of Thoroughbred Racing, including the Kentucky Oaks, the Black-Eyed Susan Stakes and Mother Goose Stakes.

Run during the third week of March, the Bourbonette Oaks currently offers a purse of $100,000.

Inaugurated in 1983, the race was run in two divisions in 1983, 1985, 1988 and 1990. In 1986, it was run in three divisions.

Records
Speed record
 1:35.00 – Buckeye Search (1997)

Most wins by a jockey
 6 – Pat Day (1987, 1989, 1990, 1994, 2001, 2002)

Most wins by a trainer
 5 – Mark E. Casse (1983, 1986, 1990, 2006, 2007)

Most wins by an owner
 2 – Taylor Asbury (1983, 1988)
 2 – Claiborne Farm (1992, 2000)

Winners

* † In 2003 Golden Marlin won the race but was disqualified and set back to second.

See also
Road to the Kentucky Oaks

References
The 2008 Bourbonette Oaks Stakes at the NTRA

1983 establishments in Kentucky
Turfway Park horse races
Flat horse races for three-year-old fillies
Graded stakes races in the United States
Recurring sporting events established in 1983
Grade 3 stakes races in the United States